Skyline High School is a four-year public secondary school in Sammamish, Washington, a suburb east of Seattle. The third and newest high school in the Issaquah School District, it opened in the fall of 1997 and serves the district's northern portion. The school colors are green and silver and the mascot is a Spartan.

Overview
For five academic years (2005–10), Skyline was a three-year senior high school (gr. 10–12). Its students fed from the Pacific Cascade Freshman Campus, a 9th-grade-only school which also included the freshman class for rival Issaquah High School.  Prior to 2005, two middle schools directly fed Skyline: Beaver Lake and Pine Lake. Pacific Cascade was reassigned as a middle school (grades 6–8) in the fall of 2010 and the two high schools (Skyline and Issaquah) regained their freshmen classes.

To accommodate the return of the freshman class, Skyline underwent a significant renovation from 2007 to 2010 that added 24 new classrooms and science labs, a new black box theater and 3-D art room, and additional athletic facilities.  Bassetti Architects was the architectural firm for the renovation.

Skyline is one of three high schools on the Sammamish Plateau, all close in proximity along 228th Avenue. Eastlake High School, in the Lake Washington School District, opened in 1993 and is about a mile (1.6 km) north of Skyline. Between the two public high schools is Eastside Catholic, a private secondary school which relocated to Sammamish in 2008.

Academics
Skyline has the reputation of being a competitive academic school, with an on-time graduation rate of 95.1%. Skyline offers the International Baccalaureate (IB) Diploma and Career-related Program to all juniors and seniors. Freshmen and sophomores who are accelerated in math also have access to IB Mathematics courses. Skyline offers a range of IB classes, which can be taken alongside standard classes.

Skyline also is part of the Running Start program. Running Start is a program that allows 11th and 12th grade students to take college courses at Washington's 34 community and technical colleges. The added bonus is the cost savings, as students receive both high school and college credit for these classes, thus accelerating their progress through the education system.

Athletics
With 19 varsity teams, 13 junior varsity teams and seven "C" teams, the athletic program provides opportunities for hundreds to compete.

Classification
Skyline competes in WIAA Class 4A, with the state's largest schools. SHS competed in 3A for its first seven years, then moved up to 4A for the 2004–05 and 2005–06 academic years. It dropped back to 3A for two years (2006–07 and 2007–08), then returned to 4A for 2008–09. Skyline is one of 9 schools in the KingCo 4A conference, along with Issaquah, Newport, Eastlake, Redmond, Bothell, Inglemoor, Mt. Si, and Woodinville. KingCo 4A is the only 4A conference in the state's SeaKing District Two, which includes Seattle and east King County.

State titles
Skyline's football program has seven state titles ((3A) 2000, (4A) 2005, (3A) 2007; (4A) 2008, 2009, 2011, 2012), and many alumni have played Division I college football. Skyline's dance team won a state title in the Dance category in 2019 and 1st overall in the pom category the following year. The girls' soccer team has six 4A state titles (2008, 2009, 2011, 2012, 2018, 2022), and the girls' swim and dive team won three consecutive 4A state titles (2009, 2010, 2011), beating the competition by over 50 points each time, as well as titles in 2015 and 2016.The boys swim and dive team won their first 4A state title in 2018. In track and field, the girls' team won the 3A state title in 2007. In Ultimate Frisbee, the Spartans went 7-1 during the regular season and won the 2013 Spring B-Division championship. The team later went on to win the Spring Reign B-Division Championship, one of the largest youth Ultimate tournaments in the country.

Notable alumni

Jake Heaps - Former NFL quarterback.
Kasen Williams - Former XFL and NFL wide receiver.
Adrian Sampson - RHP for the Chicago Cubs. 
Max Browne - Former collegiate quarterback, and now a post-game analyst for USC on KABC (AM).
Riley Griffiths - Actor and a collegiate defensive linemen.
Matisse Thybulle - NBA player (attended for two years, before transferring to Eastside Catholic School).
Erin Hawksworth, news anchor and former sports analyst for CNN.

Controversies

2014 rape and subsequent victim harassment campaign
In 2014, two members of the Skyline football team raped a 16-year-old girl. According to the lawsuit filed in October 2018 by the victim and her younger sister, the Issaquah School District refused to investigate the two players. The two individuals pleaded guilty in a juvenile court, and were forced to transfer out of Skyline.

Many Skyline students responded by starting a targeted harassment campaign of the victim to force her to transfer so the football players could come back. This included cyber-bullying, personal confrontations, firebombing the victims house, and planting drugs on her. In one instance, former Skyline football coach Brad Burmester responded "Preach on, brother" to a tweet saying that the victim should be the one to transfer.

After the victim's graduation the harassment was targeted towards her younger sister who continued to attend the school.

References

External links

Educational institutions established in 1997
High schools in King County, Washington
International Baccalaureate schools in Washington (state)
Public high schools in Washington (state)
Schools in Sammamish, Washington
1997 establishments in Washington (state)